Da Cor do Pecado (English title: Shades of Sin) is a Brazilian telenovela produced and broadcast by TV Globo in the traditional 7pm timeslot between 26 January and 28 August 2004 with a total of 185 episodes, replacing Kubanacan and preceding Começar de Novo.

It is one of Rede Globo's most successful productions, just coming after Avenida Brasil, in terms of viewership and worldwide exhibition, as it been sold to close to 100 countries.

Starring Taís Araújo, Reynaldo Gianecchini, Giovanna Antonelli, Lima Duarte, Rosi Campos, Aracy Balabanian, Guilherme Weber and Tuca Andrada.

Synopsis

First phase 
In the 1970s, businessman Alfonso Lambertini has an affair with a maid of his mansion, Edilásia, and she becomes pregnant. Alfonso is the husband of Silvia, a woman of fragile health whom he loves. Edilásia is pregnant with twin boys but hides it from Alfonso. Germana, the housekeeper and a close friend of Alfonso and Silvia, helps Edilásia flee, leaving one child with Alfonso and taking the other. Shortly after, Silvia dies, and Alfonso is plunged into depression.

Thirty years later, Alfonso's son, Paco, is now a botanist who is very dedicated to his profession and who does not agree with his father's actions, such as deforestation and burning of trees for the sake of establishing his ventures. Paco does not know he has a twin and that his biological mother is Edilásia; he thinks he is the son of Silvia. On a trip to Maranhão, Paco meets Preta, a beautiful black girl from São Luís do Maranhão who sells herbs in a tent with her mother, Lita.

Preta and Paco fall in love at first sight and they exchange vows of eternal passion, but Preta is suspicious of a rich white man, because she is black and poor and knows that a rich white man would use her easily. However, Paco is engaged to Bárbara, a cunning woman who is false, manipulative, cruel, dishonest and very biased; she hates Preta and often refer to Preta as "little blackie".

Meanwhile, Apollo lives with his mother Edilásia and his four half-brothers: Ulisses, Thor, Dionísio and Abelardo on the beach. It is a simple life, but very affectionate. Edilásia is sad to have left another son, Paco, in the hands of a powerful man as Alfonso. Her late husband, Napoleon Sardinha, was a great wrestler and is revered by the whole family, who also practice the sport. Apollo does not know the truth and thinks his father is Napoleon.

The story has other nuclei, such as Vera and Edu, Bárbara's parents who are divorced and who love to pose as wealthy, but are actually each supported by Bárbara. Both fully support the coup on Paco's daughter. Other plots include Moa, a passionate surfer who becomes romantically involved with Apollo, Ulisses, Thor, Dionísio and Abelardo; and Kaíke, Bárbara's lover, blinded by love, who will do anything for her, including traps to separate Preta and Paco.

It is in one of those traps that Paco is disappointed with Preta: Bárbara and Kaíke make it appear that Preta bought almost fifty thousand dollars on appliances and furniture using Paco's credit cards, and even betrayed him. At the same time, Paco learns that Bárbara is pregnant by him - when in fact the child is Kaíke's - and has a big fight with his father. Soon, Paco learns that Bárbara is Kaíke's lover, and becomes furious with her. The snake convinces Paco that Alfonso will intern in a hospital for the insane. All this culminates in a helicopter tour with Paco and Bárbara.

At the same time, Apollo and Ulisses are traveling to Brazil in a sailboat. One night, the brothers host some strange-looking men. Ulisses discovers that they are carrying almost one hundred million dollars in gold stolen from the Group Lambertini. Upon learning that Ulisses discovered this, the men try to kill him, but Apollo stops them and falls into the sea along with all the gold, presumes dead. The men flee. The next morning, Paco, mad with hatred of life, takes the helicopter out to the sea and nearly dies when a piece of iron strikes him in the head. He is saved by Ulisses, who was coincidentally in the same place and believes that Paco is Apollo because the two are completely identical. Paco then proves to that Ulisses that he is not Apollo, and the two are puzzled. Ulisses, however, does not dare tell his mother that her "favorite" son died and suggests that Paco take his place. Seeing a unique opportunity to abandon a life surrounded by deceit and brutality of those who live around them and start a new life from scratch, Paco accepts. At the same time, in Maranhão, Preta has two stories: the first is that Paco, the love of his life, died. The second is that she is pregnant with Paco's child.

Second phase 
Eight years pass. Paco is still in Maranhão with Ulisses, preparing to return home. Preta is the mother of Raí, naughty boy with a good heart, and she wants to prove that the boy is the son of Paco.

Bárbara has a troubled son, Octávio, and is married to Tony, an unscrupulous and calculating employee of Alfonso. They will do anything to ensure that Preta does not prove that Raí is the son of Paco.

Now, Paco, pretending to be Apollo, and Ulisses are back, and the lives of all will change with the return of Apollo, who was not dead, only suffering from amnesia.

Cast

Reception

Ratings 

In its premiere, Da Cor do Pecado recorded a viewership rating of 42 points with 61% share.
In the finale, it registered viewership rating of 51 points with 69% audience share.

It averagely obtained viewership rating of 43.1 points the highest in the 21st century.

References

External links
 

2004 Brazilian television series debuts
2004 Brazilian television series endings
2004 telenovelas
Brazilian telenovelas
TV Globo telenovelas
Telenovelas by João Emanuel Carneiro
Portuguese-language telenovelas
Television shows set in Rio de Janeiro (city)
Television series about twins
Racism in fiction